Bohumil Berdych is a retired slalom canoeist who competed for Czechoslovakia in the early 1950s. He won a silver medal in the C-2 team event at the 1951 ICF Canoe Slalom World Championships in Steyr.

References

Czechoslovak male canoeists
Possibly living people
Year of birth missing
Medalists at the ICF Canoe Slalom World Championships